Ivan Cherednik (Иван Владимирович Чередник) is a Russian-American mathematician. He has also dealt with algebraic geometry, number theory and Soliton equations. His research interests include representation theory, mathematical physics, and algebraic combinatorics. He is currently the Austin M. Carr Distinguished Professor of mathematics at the University of North Carolina at Chapel Hill.

In 1998 he was an Invited Speaker of the International Congress of Mathematicians in Berlin.

Publications

References

University of North Carolina page about Ivan Cherednik
Cherednik on Math-Net.Ru

Russian mathematicians
20th-century American mathematicians
21st-century American mathematicians
University of North Carolina at Chapel Hill faculty
Algebraists
Living people
1951 births